The A686 is a road in Northern England. It runs from Penrith in Cumbria to Haydon Bridge in Northumberland. AA Magazine named the A686 as one of their "Ten Great Drives" owing to the dramatic scenery of the North Pennines hills encountered along its route. Travel journalist Phil Llewellin said: 

The road is popular with motorbikers, and due to the great number of steep bends many casualties occur along the road. It was recently voted ninth best drive in the country by Top Gear magazine.

Route
The A686 begins at a roundabout with the A66 road and A6 road on the edge of Penrith, Cumbria, though it originally started in nearby Carleton at a crossroads with the former route of the A66. The road heads in a north-easterly direction crossing the River Eden before going through the village of Langwathby. It continues through Melmerby and across the Pennines before reaching the isolated market town of Alston.

It meets the A689 road (to Brampton and Bishop Auckland) and then crosses the border into Northumberland. It continues past the villages of Ninebanks, Bearsbridge and Whitfield. It meets the B6305 road to Hexham, and  later terminates at its junction with the A69 road just east of Haydon Bridge.

References

External links

 SABRE page on the A686

Roads in Cumbria
Roads in England
Roads in Northumberland
Scenic routes in the United Kingdom
Transport in County Durham
Transport in Northumberland